Walter R. V. Skanes (April 3, 1896 – November 3, 1961) was a fisherman, oil worker, civil servant and political figure in Newfoundland. He represented St. Barbe in the Dominion of Newfoundland legislature from 1928 to 1932 as a Liberal.

He was born in Trout River, the son of Francis Skanes and Diana Payne and was educated at Bonne Bay. In 1920, he became a travelling mail clerk. Skanes married May Roberts in 1926. After retiring from politics in 1932, he was employed in the civil service and private companies. He died in St. John's at the age of 65.

References 

1896 births
1961 deaths
Dominion of Newfoundland politicians